Basswood is an unincorporated community in Iron County, in the U.S. state of Michigan.

The community was named from a grove of basswood trees near the town site.

References

Unincorporated communities in Iron County, Michigan
Unincorporated communities in Michigan